In April 2022, Aidan Moffitt (aged 42) and Michael Snee (aged 58) were found murdered in their own homes in Sligo, Ireland, in the space of 24 hours. Both men were found with serious physical injuries due to a physical assault, around 1km apart in the town. Separate murder investigations into their deaths were conducted, with Gardaí probing links to a serial killer. A 22-year-old man, Yousef Palani, was arrested on 12 April, and was charged with the murders the following day.

Moffitt was found dead on the night of Monday 11 April and Snee was found dead on the night of Tuesday 12 April.

Investigation
42-year-old Aidan Moffitt was found badly mutilated at his semi-detached home in Cartron Heights estate on the northern outskirts of Sligo town at 8:30pm on Monday 11 April. He was last seen socialising the night before. Originally from Ballaghaderreen, County Roscommon, he was a well-known local auctioneer and Fine Gael activist.

At approximately 10:30pm the next night, Gardaí were called to an apartment at Connaughton Road in Sligo, where a second man, 58-year-old Michael Snee was discovered dead with significant physical injuries. At about 1:45am, following what was described as "intense local Garda activity and inquiries", Sligo Gardaí, assisted by the Armed Support Unit, arrested a 22-year-old man on suspicion of murder. Snee was a retired healthcare worker, who had impaired vision in one eye.

Gardaí were examining whether there was a homophobic motive for the killings and whether they were the work of a potential serial killer, who was targeting men on dating apps. This prompted Gardaí to issue advice to the public, urging people to take necessary precautions before meeting people online.

Gardaí were also investigating whether the killings were linked to a stabbing attack of another man in his 40s, Anthony Burke, in Sligo town which saw the victim lose an eye on Saturday 9 April. They believed that the killings may not have been the perpetrator's first attempts at violent assaults and may have searched for other victims.

Accused
On 14 April, a 22-year-old man, Yousef Palani, was charged with the two murders and was also charged with the assault of a third man, arising out of an incident on 9 April. That afternoon, he was brought before a special sitting of Sligo District Court and was heckled and shouted at by a large crowd who had gathered outside the courthouse. Palani was put on suicide watch by the Prison Service and was remanded in custody at Castlerea Prison to appear again at Sligo District Court on 21 April via video link. He was subsequently remanded in custody again until 12 May. As of late September 2022, Palani remained in prison, pending "service of the Book of Evidence".

Reactions
On 13 April 2022, Minister for Justice Helen McEntee described the murders as "atrocious crimes" and said she wanted to reassure people and the LGBT community that any crimes motivated by hate or prejudice would not be tolerated and would carry higher sentences.

Taoiseach Micheál Martin said he was "deeply concerned" and urged anyone with any information to contact Gardaí. Tánaiste Leo Varadkar said he was "shocked" and "worried" by the two deaths.

Members of the LGBT community in Ireland said they felt "deeply distressed and concerned" following the attacks, while LGBT Ireland said it was "shocked" and "deeply saddened" by the "heinous crimes" perpetrated in Sligo and called on the Government to urgently enact hate crime laws.

Towns, villages and communities across Ireland gathered to pay tribute to the memory of Moffitt and Snee in the days after their deaths, with vigils taking place in Sligo, Dublin, Limerick,  Waterford, Wexford, Galway, Belfast, Cork, Kilkenny, Louth and Tipperary.

References

2022 in Ireland
2022 murders in the Republic of Ireland
April 2022 crimes in Europe
Deaths by stabbing in Ireland 
History of County Sligo
Irish murder victims
Irish victims of crime
Sligo (town)
People from County Sligo
People from County Roscommon
Violent deaths in the Republic of Ireland
Violence against LGBT people in Europe
Victims of anti-LGBT hate crimes
Violence against gay men
Irish LGBT people